The 2016 Dublin Senior Football Championship was the 130th edition of Dublin GAA's premier gaelic football tournament for senior clubs in County Dublin, Ireland. 32 teams participate, with the winner representing Dublin in the Leinster Senior Club Football Championship.

Ballyboden St. Enda's were the defending Dublin (and All-Ireland champions) having defeated St. Vincent's in the 2015 Dublin championship final. They gave up their titles in the last sixteen stage when losing to Kilmacud Crokes.

On 5 November 2016, St. Vincent's claimed their 28th Dublin S.F.C. title and 4th in 5 years when defeating Castleknock (who reached their first final after only two years in the senior grade and only their 18th year in existence after being established in 1998) in Parnell Park in the final by 0-15 to 0-10. 

O'Tooles were relegated to the Intermediate Football Championship for 2017 after they failed to fulfill their Round 1 Senior 'B' Replay with Naomh Mearnóg this year. They will be replaced by Paul Flynn's Fingallians who claimed this year's I.F.C. title.

Format

The championship has a straight knock-out format. The losers of the Round 1 matches enter the Senior 'B' Football Championship. Losers of Round 1 of the Senior 'B' Championship enter a relegation playoff if a non-reserve side wins the Dublin Intermediate Football Championship.

Promoted to SFC in 2015

 None

Relegated from SFC in 2015

 None

Senior 'A' Football Championship

Senior 'A' Round 1
All 32 teams enter the championship at this stage. The 16 winners enter Round 2 while the 16 losers enter the Senior 'B' Football Championship.

Senior 'A' Round 2
The 16 winners of the First Round matches play each other in this round. The 8 winners proceed to the Quarter-Finals while the 8 losers exit the championship.

Senior 'A' Quarter Finals

Senior 'A' Semi-Finals

Senior 'A' Final

Senior 'B' Football Championship

Senior 'B' Round 1
The 16 losers from the First Round play off in this round. The 8 winners proceed to the Senior 'B' Quarter-Finals while the 8 losers will exit the championship. One team was designated home advantage for each tie in a random draw. The match involving O'Toole's and Naomh Mearnóg was abandoned while the teams were level after 55 minutes due to a brawl involving players, management and supporters.

Senior 'B' Quarter-Finals

Senior 'B' Semi-Finals

Senior 'B' Final

References

External links
Dublin GAA Fixtures & Results
Live Updates and Scores

Dublin Senior Football Championship
Dublin Senior Football Championship